William Gelston Bates (November 17, 1803 – July 5, 1880) was an American politician.

Bates, the eldest child of the Hon. Elijah Bates and of his wife Mary, daughter of Dr. Israel Ashley, Jr., of Westfield, Mass, was born in Westfield, November 17, 1803.

He graduated from Yale College in 1825.  He began the study of law with his father, and continued it at the Northampton Law School in Northampton, Mass. In August 1828, he was admitted to the bar of his native county, and began practice in Westfield, succeeding to the business of his father, who now retired. He soon won distinction as a counselor, and continued in successful practice until forced to retire by the approach of disease and old age.

From 1839 to 1847 he was a member of the Massachusetts State Board of Education. In 1840 he was elected to the Massachusetts State Senate, and in 1844 and 1845 was a member of the Massachusetts Governor's Council. In 1868 he was also a member of the Massachusetts House of Representatives. In 1853 he was appointed District Attorney for the Western District of Massachusetts; but finding that the necessary duties encroached too much on his regular engagements, he resigned the office after one year's service.

Besides his professional labors his readiness and felicity as a writer and speaker led him to be invited to the delivery of many public addresses, of several which were printed.  The most important were the Historical Address at the 200th Anniversary of the Incorporation of Westfield in 1869, and the Address at the Dedication of the new Court House in Springfield in 1874.

He died in Westfield, July 5, 1880, in his 77th year.

He was married, in October 1830, to Jane P., daughter of Maj. William Ashley, of Sheffield, Mass.  Of their eight children, three daughters survived him.

See also
 1868 Massachusetts legislature

External links
 

1803 births
1880 deaths
People from Westfield, Massachusetts
Yale College alumni
Northampton Law School alumni
Massachusetts lawyers
Massachusetts state senators
Members of the Massachusetts House of Representatives
American male writers
Members of the Massachusetts Governor's Council
19th-century American politicians
19th-century American lawyers